Waarrior Savitri is a 2016 Indian Hindi-language action drama film written and directed by Param Gill. The film stars Niharica Raizada, Rajat Barmecha, Om Puri, Karmveer Choudhary and Gulshan Grover. Upender Maheshwari and Bobby Kanda produced Waarrior Savitri under the banner of Dr Bob’s Production. It is a modern-day adaption of the Indian fable – Satyavan Savitri.

Waarrior Savitri has been filmed in Chandelao Garh, Jodhpur, Mumbai and  Las Vegas. British model Lucy Pinder made her Bollywood debut with the film. The film was  released on 25 August 2016.

The film was banned in many parts of India for portraying goddess Savitri as a modern 21st century woman. Director Param Gill received death threats, and the film received a very low key release.

Plot

Cast
 Niharica Raizada as Savitri
 Lucy Pinder as Candy
 Rajat Barmecha as Satya
 Om Puri as Yamraj
 Gulshan Grover as Satya's father
 Karmveer Choudhary as Pandit ji
 Tim Man as The Monk
 Ron Smoorenburg as Mani John
 Sheetal Sharma as Savitri's friend
 Aditya Raj Kapoor as Thakur - Savitri's father
 Palak J. Jhaveri as Baby Savitri

Music

All songs were written and composed by Param Gill.

Controversy
The film received opposition at some places for its depiction of the Hindu goddess Savitri as a 21st-century woman.

References

External links
 
 

2016 films
Indian action drama films
2010s Hindi-language films
Girls with guns films
Indian martial arts films
Films shot in the Las Vegas Valley
Films shot in Rajasthan
2016 martial arts films
2016 action drama films
Films based on Indian folklore
Savitri and Satyavan